Aplexa is a genus of small, left-handed or sinistral, air-breathing freshwater snails, aquatic pulmonate gastropod mollusks in the family Physidae.

Shell description
These small snails are quite distinctive, because they have shells that are sinistral, which means that if you hold the shell such that the spire is pointing up, then the aperture is on the left-hand side.

The shells of Aplexa species have a long and large aperture, a relatively high and pointed spire, and no operculum. The shells are thin and corneous and rather transparent.

Species
Species in the genus Aplexa include:
 Aplexa atava White, 1877
 Aplexa brevispirata (Cossmann, 1913)
 Aplexa disjuncta (White, 1879)
 Aplexa elongata (Say, 1821) - the lance aplexa
 Aplexa gigantea (Michaud, 1837)
 Aplexa grasseti (Matheron, 1878)
 Aplexa heberti (Deshayes, 1863)
 Aplexa hypnorum (Linnaeus, 1758) - the moss bladder snail
 Aplexa jaimei (Hermite, 1879)
 Aplexa kasekikabe (Isaji, 2010)
 Aplexa macerata (Russell, 1937)
 Aplexa militaria (Yen & Reeside, 1946) 
 Aplexa morrisonana (Yen & Reeside, 1946) 
 Aplexa praelonga (Matheron ex Heer, 1861)
 Aplexa primigenia (Deshayes, 1863) * Aplexa prisca (Noulet, 1854) 
 Aplexa pseudogigantea (F. Sandberger, 1870)
 Aplexa pulchella (A. d'Orbigny, 1850) 
 Aplexa ricei (Russell, 1957) 
 Aplexa rivalis (Maton & Rackett, 1807)
 Aplexa subelongata (Meek & Hayden, 1856)
 Aplexa subhypnorum (Gottschick, 1920)

References

Further reading 
 "Genus summary for Aplexa". AnimalBase.
 Janus, Horst, 1965. ‘’The young specialist looks at land and freshwater molluscs’’, Burke, London

Physidae